Breže is a settlement in the Municipality of Ribnica in southern Slovenia. The area is part of the traditional region of Lower Carniola and is now included in the Southeast Slovenia Statistical Region.

Name
Breže was attested in written sources as Vreisach in 1220 and Friesach in 1405, among other spellings.

References

External links
Breže on Geopedia

Populated places in the Municipality of Ribnica